Kolbe is a surname.

Those bearing it include:
 Adolph Wilhelm Hermann Kolbe (1818–1884), German chemist
 Andreas Kolbe (fl. 1557), German printer, prominent in Marburg in the 1540s and 1550s
 Athena Kolbe, human rights researcher, and writer
 Caroline Ridderstolpe, née Kolbe (1793–1878), Swedish composer and singer
 Cheslin Kolbe (born 1993), South African rugby union player
 Clive Kolbe (1944–2016), South African cricketer
 Daniela Kolbe (born 1980), German politician
 Emma Coe Kolbe (1850–1913), business woman and plantation owner of mixed American/Samoan descent
 Fritz Kolbe (1900–1971), German diplomat and World War II Allied spy
 Georg Kolbe (1877–1947), German sculptor
 Heinrich Christoph Kolbe (1771–1836), German painter
 Helga Kolbe, retired  German rower 
 Hellmuth Kolbe (1926–2002), Swiss musician, audio recording and acoustics pioneer
 Hermann Julius Kolbe (1855–1939), German entomologist
 Ino Kolbe (1914–2010), born Ino Voigt, German Esperantist
 Jim Kolbe (1942-2022), American politician
 Johann Kasimir Kolbe von Wartenberg (1643–1712), the first ever Minister-President of the kingdom of Prussia
 Josefine 'Pepa' Kolbe, a female Austrian international table tennis player. 
 Laura Kolbe (born 1957), Finnish professor of European history
 Maximilian Kolbe (1894–1941), Polish Conventual Franciscan friar and saint
 Parke Kolbe (1881–1942), American author, teacher, administrator and university president
 Peter Kolbe (1675–1726), German astronomer and explorer of South Africa
 Peter-Michael Kolbe (born 1953), German rower and five time world champion
 Steve Kolbe (born 1967), American sportscaster 
 Tanja Kolbe (born 1990), German ice dancer
 Winrich Kolbe (1940–2012), German-born American television director and producer

See also 
 Kolb (surname)

Germanic-language surnames